Off the Wall Productions is a theater production company located in Carnegie, Pennsylvania, USA. A non-profit 501 C3 and Carnegie Stage’s Resident Professional Theater Company, working under contract with Actors' Equity Association, producing a minimum of four plays during their season from October to May. Recent focus has been the production of new plays, written by women playwrights.

Mission 
The theatre's mission is to create a more conscious and compassionate community, while providing a living wage for all artists, and to encourage and support the admiration of all arts and artists by providing a home in which live theater, dance, music, and comedy can be presented, while nurturing, challenging, inspiring and empowering women theater artists from the area and beyond to collaborate as playwrights, directors, technicians, and actors, explore new ideas, and develop new works."

History 
Established in 2007 in Washington under artistic director Virginia Wall Gruenert and managing director Hans H Gruenert, the theatre started out producing established plays and musicals as well as Virginia Wall Gruenert's original plays Shaken & Stirred, and Without Ruth.  Off the Wall's productions have consistently received positive reviews from local critics, having had its actors and designers recognized in the yearly "Best of" articles in Observer-Reporter and Pittsburgh-Outonline as well as having had praise from Pittsburgh City Paper and Pittsburgh Post-Gazette.

In 2012, the theatre company moved to a new location in Carnegie that also serves as a multicultural center for use by other performance groups, including the Pittsburgh New Works Festival.

See also
Theatre in Pittsburgh

References

External links
 Off The Wall Productions official website
 Virginia Wall Gruenert official website
 Carnegie Stage official website

Theatre companies in Pennsylvania
Organizations established in 2007
2007 establishments in Pennsylvania